Romania was represented by 4Kids at the Junior Eurovision Song Contest 2007 with the song "Sha-la-la". The song was selected as the winner of the Romanian national final Selecţia Naţională Eurovision Junior 2007, held on 24 June 2007.

Before Junior Eurovision

Selecţia Naţională Eurovision Junior 2007 
The final took place on 24 June 2007. 14 songs took part and the winner was determined by a 50/50 combination of votes from a jury panel and a public televote. The winner was "Sha-la-la" performed by 4Kids, receiving the maximum points from both the jury and the televoters.

At Junior Eurovision

Voting

Notes

References

External links 
 Official Romanian Junior Eurovision Site of 2007
 ESCKaz Page on Romania's Entry

Junior Eurovision Song Contest
Romania
Junior